Azim Darreh (also Romanized as ʿAẓīm Darreh and Aẓīmdarreh) is a village in Ali Sadr Rural District, Gol Tappeh District, Kabudarahang County, Hamadan Province, Iran. At the 2006 census, its population was 95, in 18 families.

References 

Populated places in Kabudarahang County